Clam Lake Township is a civil township of Wexford County in the U.S. state of Michigan. The population was 2,467 at the 2010 census.

Communities
Elton is a former settlement in the southeast corner of the township.  It had a rural post office  from Cadillac that operated from July 6, 1897 until September 30, 1907.
Hobart was founded in 1871 as a lumbering community and given a railway station on the Grand Rapids and Indiana Railroad. The community contained its own post office from July 7, 1876 until January 30, 1923.

Geography

Major highways
 runs diagonally southwest–northeast through the center of the township.
 enters at the northern border of the township and briefly runs concurrent with U.S. Route 131.
 runs diagonally southeast–northwest through the center of the township and briefly runs concurrent with U.S. Route 131 and M-55.

Demographics
As of the census of 2000, there were 2,238 people, 821 households, and 637 families residing in the township. The racial makeup of the township was 98.88% White, 0.13% African American, 0.27% Native American, 0.09% Asian, and 0.63% from two or more races. Hispanic or Latino of any race were 0.49% of the population.

There were 821 households, out of which 35.9% had children under the age of 18 living with them, 69.3% were married couples living together, 4.8% had a female householder with no husband present, and 22.3% were non-families. 18.3% of all households were made up of individuals, and 6.6% had someone living alone who was 65 years of age or older.  The average household size was 2.71 and the average family size was 3.07.

In the township the population was spread out, with 27.4% under the age of 18, 5.6% from 18 to 24, 26.5% from 25 to 44, 27.6% from 45 to 64, and 12.8% who were 65 years of age or older.  The median age was 39 years. For every 100 females, there were 96.1 males.  For every 100 females age 18 and over, there were 97.1 males.

The median income for a household in the township was $47,102, and the median income for a family was $53,438. Males had a median income of $34,714 versus $22,217 for females. The per capita income for the township was $21,062.  About 1.3% of families and 3.8% of the population were below the poverty line, including 3.7% of those under age 18 and 5.1% of those age 65 or over.

Education
Clam Lake Township is served by two separate public school districts.  The vast majority of the township is served by Cadillac Area Public Schools to the north in the city of Cadillac.  A smaller portion of the southwest corner of the township is served by Pine River Area Schools to the south in the village of LeRoy in Osceola County.

References

Sources

Townships in Wexford County, Michigan
Townships in Michigan
Populated places established in 1877
1877 establishments in Michigan